Yuly may refer to:

Yuly Aykhenvald (1872–1928), Russian Jewish literary critic who developed a native brand of Aestheticism
Yuly Conus (1869–1942), Russian violinist and composer
Yuly Martov (1873–1923), politician and revolutionary, leader of the Mensheviks in Russia
Yuly Rybakov (born 1946), human rights activist, a former member of the State Duma (1993–2003), a former Chairman of the Subcommittee on Human Rights (2000–2003), the founder of the magazine "Terra incognita", a former political prisoner
Yuly Shokalsky (1856–1940), Russian oceanographer, cartographer, and geographer

See also
Yuli (disambiguation)